"Silver Bird" is a song by Tina Rainford, the title track of her 1976 LP. It was recorded in both German and English, with both renditions becoming hits in multiple nations. 

The German version became hit in central Europe during the fall of 1976, reaching number five in Germany and Austria.  The song did best in Switzerland, where it reached number two.

The English version was a hit in Australia, where it reached number 30 in 1977.  It also reached the Country charts of the U.S. (#25) and Canada (#28) in mid-1977.

Chart history

Weekly charts

Year-end charts

Cover versions
"Silver Bird" was covered by American actress and singer Audrey Landers in 1988.  It is a track on her Have A Heart LP.

References

External links
  (Tina Rainford)
  (Audrey Landers)

1976 songs
1977 singles
CBS Records singles